The G1 Climax 32 was a professional wrestling tournament promoted by New Japan Pro-Wrestling (NJPW). The tournament commenced on July 16 and  concluded on August 18, 2022. It was the thirty-second edition of G1 Climax and the forty-eighth edition of the tournament counting its previous forms under different names.

Considered NJPW's most important tournament, the G1 Climax featured twenty-eight wrestlers, divided into four blocks of seven ("A", "B", "C", and "D"). Each participant faced all six other wrestlers within the same block in singles matches. The winner of each block was determined via a point system, with two points for a win, one point for a draw, and no points for a defeat. Each night of the event saw one match from each block between two members. On the final two days of the event, the winners of each block entered a four-man playoff to determine the winner of the tournament, who also receives a future match for the IWGP World Heavyweight Championship at Wrestle Kingdom. The event was broadcast live on TV Asahi and Fighting TV Samurai in Japan, and New Japan Pro-Wrestling World worldwide.

For the first time in three years, the block returned to the summer, moving away from the previous years where it was held in the fall between September–October due to the 2020 Summer Olympic Games being held in Japan, while coinciding with the COVID-19 pandemic. At twenty-eight participants, it was the largest field in G1 Climax history and the most competitors since 2014. The tournament  also ran in a four-block round-robin format for the first time since 2000.

The event saw the G1 Climax debuts of Tom Lawlor, Jonah, El Phantasmo, Aaron Henare, and David Finlay.

Production

Tournament rules 

The tournament features twenty-eight wrestlers, divided into four blocks of seven ("A", "B", "C", and "D"). Each participant faces all six other wrestlers within the same block in singles matches. The winner of each 
block is determined via a point system, with two points for a win, one point for a draw, and no points for a loss; each night of the event sees one match from each block between two members competing for the tournament. In case of several wrestlers sharing the top score, the results of the matches those wrestlers had when facing each other in the tournament act as tiebreaker, with the one having the most wins over the other top-scorers determining the winner of the block.

On the final two days of the event, the respective winners of each block enter a four-man single-elimination playoff to determine the winner of the G1 Climax, who would gain a future match for the IWGP World Heavyweight Championship, NJPW's top championship, at Wrestle Kingdom, NJPW's biggest yearly event; if the IWGP Heavyweight Champion himself wins, he selects his opponent at Wrestle Kingdom. The Young Lion matches have a fifteen-minutes time limit, while the matches of the tournament have a 30-minutes time limit (with the time limit being reached resulting in a tie); the semifinal (block winners) and final (semifinal winners) matches, where a winner must be determined, have no time limit.

History 
On April 9, 2022, at Hyper Battle '22, NJPW announced that the 2022 edition of the G1 Climax would take place from July to August, returning to the summer for the first time since 2019. During Dominion 6.12 in Osaka-jo Hall on June 22, NJPW announced the participants for the G1 Climax.

Storylines 
The event includes matches that result from scripted storylines, where wrestlers portray heroes, villains, or less distinguishable characters in scripted events that build tension and culminate in a wrestling match or series of matches.

Venues

Results

Night 1
The first night of the tournament took place on July 16, 2022, at Hokkai Kitayell in Toyohira-ku, Sapporo.

Tournament scores

Night 2
The second night of the tournament took place on July 17, 2022, at Hokkai Kitayell in Toyohira-ku, Sapporo.

Tournament scores

Night 3
The third night of the tournament took place on July 20, 2022, at Xebio Arena Sendai in Sendai, Miyagi.

Tournament scores

Night 4
The fourth night of the tournament took place on July 23, 2022, at Ota City General Gymnasium in Ōta, Tokyo.

Tournament scores

Night 5
The fifth night of the tournament took place on July 24, 2022, at Ota City General Gymnasium in Ōta, Tokyo.

Tournament scores

Night 6
The sixth night of the tournament took place on July 26, 2022, at Korakuen Hall in Bunkyo, Tokyo.

Tournament scores

Night 7
The seventh night of the tournament took place on July 27, 2022, at Korakuen Hall in Bunkyo, Tokyo.

Tournament scores

Night 8
The eighth night of the tournament took place on July 30, 2022, at Aichi Prefectural Gymnasium in Nagoya, Aichi.

Tournament scores

Night 9
The ninth night of the tournament took place on July 31, 2022, at Aichi Prefectural Gymnasium in Nagoya, Aichi.

Tournament scores

Night 10
The tenth night of the tournament took place on August 2, 2022, at Hamamatsu Arena in Hamamatsu, Shizuoka.

Tournament scores

Night 11
The eleventh night of the tournament took place on August 5, 2022, at Item Ehime in Matsuyama, Ehime.

Tournament scores

Night 12
The twelfth night of the tournament took place on August 6, 2022, at Osaka Prefectural Gymnasium in Namba, Osaka.

Tournament scores

Night 13
The thirteenth night of the tournament took place on August 7, 2022, at Osaka Prefectural Gymnasium in Namba, Osaka.

Tournament scores

Night 14
The fourteenth night of the tournament took place on August 9, 2022, at Hiroshima Sun Plaza in Nishi-ku, Hiroshima.

Tournament scores

Night 15
The fifteenth night of the tournament took place on August 10, 2022, at Hiroshima Sun Plaza in Nishi-ku, Hiroshima.

Tournament scores

Night 16
The sixteenth night of the tournament took place on August 13, 2022, at Machida Municipal Gymnasium in Machida, Tokyo.

Tournament scores

Night 17
The seventeenth night of the tournament took place on August 14, 2022, at White Ring in Nagano, Nagano.

Tournament scores

Night 18
The eighteenth night of the tournament took place on August 16, 2022, at Nippon Budokan in Chiyoda, Tokyo.

Tournament scores

Night 19
The nineteenth night of the tournament took place on August 17, 2022, at Nippon Budokan in Chiyoda, Tokyo.

Night 20
The final night of the tournament took place on August 18, 2022, at Nippon Budokan in Chiyoda, Tokyo.

Participants

Notes

References

External links 

 G1 Climax official website 

New Japan Pro-Wrestling tournaments
New Japan Pro-Wrestling shows
2022 in professional wrestling
July 2022 events in Japan
August 2022 events in Japan